Krynauw Otto (born 8 October 1971) is a South African former professional rugby union player who played as a lock.

Playing career

Provincial
He was a member of the Blue Bulls team that won the Currie Cup in 1998.

International
Otto made his debut for the South African national team in the 1995 Rugby World Cup against  at Newlands in Cape Town and went on to play 38 tests.

He was part of the 1998 Springbok team that won the Tri-Nations and a member of the 1999 World Cup squad that finished third in the tournament.

Otto retired at the age of 28 after medical examinations revealed a subdural haematoma in the left frontal area of his brain, incurred during a match against Australia on 8 July 2000.

Test history

Accolades
In 1993, Otto was nominated one of the five most Promising Players of the Year (under-23), along with FP Naude, Ryno Opperman, Christiaan Scholtz and Johan Roux.

See also
List of South Africa national rugby union players – Springbok no. 615

References

External links
 Krynauw Otto (Archived) at sporting-heroes.net

1971 births
Living people
Rugby union locks
South African rugby union players
South Africa international rugby union players
Bulls (rugby union) players
Blue Bulls players
Rugby union players from Mpumalanga